Cigaritis maximus or Karen Silverline is a butterfly in the family Lycaenidae. It was described by Henry John Elwes in 1893. It is found in Indochina in the Indomalayan realm (Burma, Thailand, and Laos).

References

External links
Cigaritis at Markku Savela's Lepidoptera and Some Other Life Forms

Cigaritis
Butterflies described in 1893